Tetrodontium is a genus of two species of moss (Bryophyta). Its name refers to its four large peristome teeth.

References

Moss genera
Tetraphidopsida